Gamasellus plumosus is a species of mite in the family Ologamasidae.

References

plumosus
Articles created by Qbugbot
Animals described in 1983